Arp-Madore 2 (also known as AM 2) is an open cluster of stars in the constellation of Puppis. It is almost 30,000 light-years away and about 5 billion years old.

References

 Simbad

Canis Major Overdensity
Puppis
Open clusters
368-7